A standing stone or standingstone is a menhir, a large man-made upright stone, typically dating from the European middle Bronze Age. Standing stone may also refer to:

Standing Stone (album), a 1997 album by Paul McCartney
Standing Stone Township, Bradford County, Pennsylvania
Standingstone, West Virginia
Standing Stone Creek, Pennsylvania
Standing Stone State Park, Tennessee 
Standing Stone Trail, Pennsylvania
The Standing Stone, a module for the role-playing game Dungeons & Dragons